Maerua brunnescens is a species of plant in the Capparaceae family. It is endemic to Mozambique.

References

brunnescens
Data deficient plants
Endemic flora of Mozambique
Taxonomy articles created by Polbot